Lazorevsky is a rural locality (a khutor) in Krasnoarmeyskoye Rural Settlement, Novonikolayevsky District, Volgograd Oblast, Russia. The population was 77 as of 2010. There are 4 streets.

Geography 
Lazorevsky is located in steppe, on the Khopyorsko-Buzulukskaya Plain, 67 km northeast of Novonikolayevsky (the district's administrative centre) by road. Aleksandrovka is the nearest rural locality.

References 

Rural localities in Novonikolayevsky District